DMDC may stand for:

Defense Manpower Data Center, a facility that keeps data on military personnel in the United States.
Dimethyl dicarbonate, a beverage preservative.
Dansk Medicinsk Data Center ApS, a Danish EMR-systems development company
Slang acronym for "Doesn't Matter, Don't Care."